Marie Thérèse or Marie-Thérèse may refer to:

Marie-Thérèse Assiga Ahanda (1941–2014), Cameroonian novelist and chemist
Marie-Thérèse Colimon-Hall (1918–1997), Haitian writer
Marie-Thérèse de Subligny (1666–1735), French ballerina
Marie-Thérèse Gantenbein-Koullen (born 1938), Luxembourgian politician
Marie Thérèse Rodet Geoffrin (1699–1777), French hostess
Marie-Thérèse Houphouët-Boigny (born 1930), First Lady of the Ivory Coast
Marie Thérèse Killens (born 1927), Liberal party member of the Canadian House of Commons
Marie Thérèse Metoyer (1742–1816), planter of indigo and tobacco
Marie Thérèse of France (1667–1672), eldest surviving daughter of Louis XIV and Infanta María Teresa of Spain; known as la Petite Madame
Marie-Thérèse of France (1746–1748), first child of Louis, Dauphin of France and Infanta Maria Teresa Rafaela of Spain
Marie Thérèse of Austria (1717–1780), Holy Roman Empress
Marie Thérèse of France (1778–1851), eldest child of Louis XVI of France and Marie-Antoinette
Marie Thérèse of Savoy (1756–1805), princess of Sardinia and of Piedmont
Maria Theresa of Spain (1638–1683), queen consort of France
Marie Thérèse of Savoy (1749-1792), Lady-in-Waiting to Marie Antoinette
Marie-Thérèse Walter (1909–1977), mistress of Pablo Picasso
Marie-Therese Guyon Cadillac (1671–1746), wife of Antoine de la Mothe Cadillac
Marie-Thérèse Morlet (1913–2005), French scientist
Marie-Thérèse Toyi, member of the Pan-African Parliament

See also

Maria Theresa (disambiguation)
Maria Theresia (disambiguation)
Marie-Thérèse-Charlotte (disambiguation)
Therese (disambiguation)
Marie (disambiguation)